Theodor Riphaen or Theodor Riphan (1577 – 14 January 1616) was a Roman Catholic prelate who served as Auxiliary Bishop of Cologne (1606–1616).

Biography
Theodor Riphaen was born in Neuss, Germany in 1577. On 30 August 1606, he was appointed during the papacy of Pope Paul V as Auxiliary Bishop of Cologne and Titular Bishop of Cyrene. On 3 March 1607, he was consecrated bishop by Attilio Amalteo, Titular Archbishop of Athenae. He served as Auxiliary Bishop of Cologne until his death on 14 January 1616.

References

External links and additional sources
 (for Chronology of Bishops) 
 (for Chronology of Bishops)  
 (for Chronology of Bishops) 
 (for Chronology of Bishops)  

16th-century German Roman Catholic bishops
Bishops appointed by Pope Paul V
1577 births
1616 deaths